Richard G. Sutter (born December 2, 1963) is a Canadian former professional ice hockey right winger who played 13 seasons in the National Hockey League (NHL) for the Pittsburgh Penguins, Philadelphia Flyers, Vancouver Canucks, St. Louis Blues, Chicago Blackhawks, Toronto Maple Leafs and Tampa Bay Lightning. He is part of the Sutter family, the family that sent 6 brothers to the NHL. He is the twin brother of Ron Sutter.

Playing career
Rich Sutter was drafted 10th overall by the Pittsburgh Penguins in the 1982 NHL Entry Draft, the same draft that saw his twin brother, Ron, get drafted 4th overall by the Philadelphia Flyers. Ron and Rich both played on the Lethbridge Broncos in the WHL, and together they led that team to the Memorial Cup in 1983. Rich would only play 9 games for the Penguins after Junior, before being traded to Ron's Flyers. Sutter was traded again in 1986 to the Vancouver Canucks. He would play four seasons with the Canucks, before being traded again, this time to the St. Louis Blues. Sutter would play for the Chicago Blackhawks, Tampa Bay Lightning, and Toronto Maple Leafs before retiring in 1995.

Later life
Rich Sutter is currently a hockey analyst for Rogers Sportsnet. Since 2014, he has primarily appeared on Hockey Central's lunch program Hockey Central at Noon, which is simulcast on TV and radio.

Career statistics

See also
Notable families in the NHL

References

 

1963 births
Living people
Arizona Coyotes scouts
Atlanta Knights players
Baltimore Skipjacks players
Canadian ice hockey right wingers
Chicago Blackhawks players
Columbus Blue Jackets
Hershey Bears players
Ice hockey people from Alberta
Lethbridge Broncos players
Minnesota Wild scouts
National Hockey League first-round draft picks
People from Beaver County, Alberta
Philadelphia Flyers players
Pittsburgh Penguins draft picks
Pittsburgh Penguins players
Red Deer Rustlers players
St. Louis Blues players
Rich
Tampa Bay Lightning players
Toronto Maple Leafs players
Canadian twins
Twin sportspeople
Vancouver Canucks players